Wahcheechee Mountain is located in the Lewis Range, Glacier National Park in the U.S. state of Montana. Stoney Indian Lake is just northeast of the peak.

Climate

Based on the Köppen climate classification, it is located in an alpine subarctic climate zone characterized by long, usually very cold winters, and short, cool to mild summers. Temperatures can drop below −10 °F with wind chill factors below −30 °F.

Geology

Like the mountains in Glacier National Park, it is composed of sedimentary rock laid down during the Precambrian to Jurassic periods.

See also
 Mountains and mountain ranges of Glacier National Park (U.S.)

References

External links
 Southeast aspect of Wahcheechee Mountain (photo): Flickr
 East aspect of Wahcheechee Mountain (photo): Flickr

Wahcheechee
Wahcheechee
Lewis Range
Mountains of Montana